

Karl-Wilhelm Specht (22 May 1894 – 3 December 1953) was a general in the Wehrmacht of Nazi Germany during World War II. He was a recipient of the Knight's Cross of the Iron Cross with Oak Leaves. He served on the "Court of Military Honour," a drumhead court-martial that expelled many of the officers involved in the 20 July Plot from the army before handing them over to the People's Court. Specht surrendered to the Soviet forces at the end of the war and died in Voikovo prison camp on 3 December 1953.

Awards and decorations
 Iron Cross (1914) 2nd Class (22 January 1915) & 1st Class (28 April 1917)

 Clasp to the Iron Cross (1939)  2nd Class (21 December 1939) & 1st Class (9 June 1940)

 Knight's Cross of the Iron Cross with Oak Leaves
 Knight's Cross on 8 September 1941 as Oberst and commander of Infanterie-Regiment 55
 60th Oak Leaves on 16 January 1942 as Oberst and commander of Infanterie-Regiment 55

References

Citations

Bibliography

 
 

1894 births
1953 deaths
People from Herdecke
German Army generals of World War II
Generals of Infantry (Wehrmacht)
German Army personnel of World War I
Recipients of the Knight's Cross of the Iron Cross with Oak Leaves
People from the Province of Westphalia
German prisoners of war in World War II held by the Soviet Union
German people who died in Soviet detention
Recipients of the clasp to the Iron Cross, 1st class
Reichswehr personnel
Military personnel from North Rhine-Westphalia